DGJ may refer to:

 Directors Guild of Japan, a trade union created to represent the interests of film directors in the film industry in Japan
 DGJ, the station code for Dungar Junction railway station, Gujarat, India